"Let Yourself Go" is a disco song recorded by the Supremes. It was written by Harold Beatty, Eddie Holland and Brian Holland (the latter two formerly part of Motown's hit songwriting team Holland-Dozier-Holland in the 1960s). The song was released on January 25, 1977 as the second single from The Supremes' Mary, Scherrie & Susaye album, and the last one by the group officially released in the US, ever. The song peaked at #83 on the US R&B charts.

Personnel
 Lead vocals by Scherrie Payne
 Background vocals by Mary Wilson, Scherrie Payne and Susaye Greene

Charts

References

1976 songs
1977 singles
The Supremes songs
Songs written by Brian Holland
Songs written by Eddie Holland
Motown singles